Bass Masters 2000 (often stylized as Bassmasters 2000), developed by Mass Media and published by THQ, is a bass fishing video game released for the Nintendo 64 in 1999.

Reception

The game received "mixed" reviews according to the review aggregation website GameRankings.

In 2017, a Youtuber by the name "StephenPlays" played this game in a charity livestream after being the first game to raise over $1000 alone with the in-chat #FishtoWin. It was received with lavish praise for its "difficult but exciting" gameplay.

References

External links
 

Fishing video games
1999 video games
THQ games
North America-exclusive video games
Nintendo 64 games
Nintendo 64-only games
Multiplayer and single-player video games
Video games scored by Jim Andron
Video games developed in the United States